Richard Lewis Boyer (194319 January 2021) was an American writer, best known for series of crime novels featuring Charlie "Doc" Adams, a dental surgeon in New England. His debut novel Billingsgate Shoal received the Edgar Award for best novel in 1983.

Boyer was born in Evanston, Illinois. He majored in English at Denison University and earned an MFA in creative writing at the University of Iowa, studying under Kurt Vonnegut. Boyer worked as a high school teacher, a sales representative for publishing company and taught English at Western Carolina University until his retirement in 2008.

Mr. Boyer died on January 19, 2021, after a long battle with Alzheimer's Disease.

Bibliography

Doc Adams novels
Billingsgate Shoal (1982)
The Penny Ferry (1984)
The Daisy Ducks (1986)
Moscow Metal (1987)
The Whale's Footprints (1988)
Gone to Earth (1990)
Yellow Bird (1991)
Pirate Trade (1994)
The Man Who Whispered (1998)

Other works
The Giant Rat of Sumatra (1976)
A Sherlockian Quartet (1999); short story collection
Mzungu Mjinga: Swahili for Crazy White Man (2004)
Buck Gentry (2005)

References

1943 births
Living people
20th-century American novelists
20th-century American male writers
21st-century American novelists
American crime fiction writers
American male novelists
21st-century American male writers